Vincent Ikechuka Gabriel (born 1931) is a Nigerian athlete. He competed in the men's high jump at the 1956 Summer Olympics.

References

External links
 

1931 births
Possibly living people
Athletes (track and field) at the 1956 Summer Olympics
Athletes (track and field) at the 1958 British Empire and Commonwealth Games
Nigerian male high jumpers
Olympic athletes of Nigeria
Place of birth missing (living people)
Commonwealth Games competitors for Nigeria
20th-century Nigerian people
21st-century Nigerian people